Mokhigul Khamdamova (born 2 October 1995) is an Uzbekistani Paralympic athlete. She won the gold medal in the women's discus throw F57 event at the 2020 Summer Paralympics held in Tokyo, Japan. She also competed in the women's shot put F57 event.

In 2019, she competed in the women's shot put F57 event at the World Para Athletics Championships held in Dubai, United Arab Emirates. She also competed in the women's discus throw F57 event.

Achievements

Discus throw

Shot put

References

External links 
 

Living people
1995 births
People from Fergana
Uzbekistani female discus throwers
Uzbekistani female shot putters
Athletes (track and field) at the 2020 Summer Paralympics
Medalists at the 2020 Summer Paralympics
Paralympic medalists in athletics (track and field)
Paralympic gold medalists for Uzbekistan
Paralympic athletes of Uzbekistan
Female competitors in athletics with disabilities
21st-century Uzbekistani women